The 1998 IAAF Golden League was the first edition of the annual international track and field meeting series, held from 9 July to 5 September. It was contested at six European meetings: the Bislett Games, Golden Gala, Herculis, Weltklasse Zürich, Memorial Van Damme and the Internationales Stadionfest (ISTAF). The series tied in with the 1998 IAAF Grand Prix Final, with the jackpot of US$1,000,000 being decided at that competition. The million-dollar prize represented the single largest prize pot ever in athletics at that point.

The jackpot was available to athletes who won at all of the seven competitions of the series in one of the 12 specified events (7 for men, 5 for women). The jackpot events for 1998 were:
Men: 100 metres, 400 metres, 1500 metres, 3000/5000/10,000 metres, 400 metres hurdles, triple jump and pole vault
Women: 100 metres, 400 metres, 1500 metres, 100 metres hurdles and javelin throw

The jackpot winners were Marion Jones (100 metres), Hicham El Guerrouj (1500 metres), Haile Gebrselassie (5000 metres/10,000 metres).

Bryan Bronson, a 400 metres hurdler, was in the running for the prize at a late stage but failed to win at the Grand Prix Final, placing only sixth. Svetlana Masterkova took six wins out of seven in the 1500 m, only being defeated by Gabriela Szabo in Paris. Michael Johnson had five 400 m victories, but did not compete at the first or last meet of the series. Trine Hattestad (women's javelin) and Maksim Tarasov (men's pole vault) each had four wins on the circuit.

Results

Men

Women

References

Results
Oslo
Rome
Monaco
Zurich
Brussels
Berlin

Golden League
IAAF Golden League
1998 in European sport